Kevin Joyce may refer to:

 Kevin Joyce (politician), Democratic member of the Illinois House of Representatives
 Kevin Joyce (basketball) (born 1951), retired American basketball player